Nepean is a former municipality and now geographic area of Ottawa, Ontario, Canada. Located west of Ottawa's inner core, it was an independent city until amalgamated with the Regional Municipality of Ottawa–Carleton in 2001 to become the new city of Ottawa. However, the name Nepean continues in common usage in reference to the area. The population of Nepean is about 186,593 people (2021 Census).

Although the neighbouring municipality of Kanata formed the entrepreneurial and high tech centre of the region, Nepean hosted noted industries such as Nortel Networks, JDS Uniphase and Gandalf Technologies. As with the rest of the National Capital Region, however, Nepean's economy was also heavily dependent on federal government employment. Most of Nepean's employed residents commute to downtown Ottawa or Kanata for work.

Nepean's policies of operational and capital budgeting prudence contrasted with the budget philosophies of some other municipalities in the area. Nepean instituted a strict 'pay-as-you-go' budgeting scheme. The city entered amalgamation with a large surplus and a record of tax restraint. However, most big-ticket municipal infrastructure items (transit, garbage collection, sanitary sewers, water, arterial roads, social services) were the responsibility of the Regional Municipality of Ottawa-Carleton. It maintained its own library system from 1954 to amalgamation, its own police force from 1964 until it was regionalized in the 1990s; its own fire service and its own recreation programs. Hydro services were the responsibility of the Hydro-Electric Commission of the City of Nepean (commonly referred to as Nepean Hydro). Education in the City of Nepean was provided by the Carleton Board of Education (later amalgamated with the Ottawa Board of Education to form the Ottawa-Carleton District School Board).

Prior to amalgamation, Nepean's City Council spent many tax dollars aggressively campaigning against what they (and their allies) referred to as the "megacity" model. The central plank of the strategy was to promote a tri-city model, which would have seen the ten municipalities of the Ottawa region reduced to three: one in the west (comprising Nepean, Kanata and the western rural municipalities), one in the east (comprising Gloucester, Cumberland and the eastern rural municipalities) and one in the centre (comprising Ottawa, Vanier and Rockcliffe Park). These efforts were in vain, as the one-city model eventually prevailed. (The one-city model was recommended by Glen Shortliffe, who was appointed by the Government of Ontario to study the issue of municipal reform in Ottawa-Carleton.)

History 
Nepean Township, originally known as Township D, was established in 1792 and originally included what is now the central area of Ottawa west of the Rideau River. Jehiel Collins, from Vermont, is believed to have been the first person to settle in Nepean Township, on the future site of Bytown. Nepean was incorporated as a city on November 24, 1978. The geographic boundaries of Nepean changed considerably over this time; the original town hall of the township of Nepean was located in Westboro, which was annexed in 1950 by the city of Ottawa. Nepean's centre then moved to the community of Bells Corners. In the 1950 and 1960s, Nepean's urban area began to expand in previous rural areas in such areas as the community of Centrepointe in the east, and the community of Barrhaven in the south.

In 1853, the City of Nepean realized that a community library was needed. By means of a bylaw and a tax levy, a library was created. In 1870, a large fire swept through Nepean, destroying several of the schoolhouses where books were stored. For the next eighty years, the library was but a memory. It was in 1951, when Ruth E. Dickinson moved to Nepean from Calgary, that she become the driving force to develop a library in Nepean. The Nepean Public Library was officially opened on March 1, 1957 and was originally known as the City View Public Library. It became the Nepean Township Public Library on December 27, 1962

Prior to its amalgamation with 10 other municipalities into the new city of Ottawa in 2001, the population of Nepean was 124,878. The 2006 census population was 138,596.

Nepean was named after Sir Evan Nepean, British Under-Secretary of State for the Home Department from 1782 to 1791.

A Nepean quarry provided the sandstone blocks that were the principal building material used in the Parliament Buildings in downtown Ottawa.

In September 2018, Nepean was one of the regions hit by a powerful storm that spawned six tornados in the Ottawa area, causing widespread damage to the Arlington Woods, Craig Henry and Colonnade Road Business Park areas.

Mayors/Reeves 
 1978 Andrew Haydon
 1978–97 Ben Franklin
 1997–2001 Mary Pitt

Communities and neighbourhoods
Prior to amalgamation, the following communities and neighbourhoods were within the city boundaries:

Arlington Woods
Ashdale
Barrhaven
Cedarhill
Chapman Mills
Davidson Heights
Half Moon Bay
Heart's Desire
Jockvale
Longfields
Old Barrhaven
Rideau Glen
Stonebridge
Bayshore
Bells Corners
Belltown
Borden Farm
Briargreen
Bruce Farm
Carleton Heights
Centrepointe
Craig Henry
Crestview
Crystal Beach
City View
Country Place
Fallowfield
Fairfield Heights
Fisher Glen
Fisher Heights
Grenfell Glen
Leslie Park
Manordale
Meadowlands
Merivale Gardens
Parkwood Hills
Pineglen
Qualicum-Graham Park
Ryan Farm
Shirleys Bay
Skyline
Tanglewood
Trend Village
Twin Elm
Woodvale

Demographics

Climate 
Nepean has a humid continental climate (Köppen Dfb), with warm, humid summers and cold winters. There is a 95% chance that all the precipitation comes by thunderstorms in the summer. There is also a small chance of cool, average rainy days in the summertime, especially in June. Nepean is also the Ottawa suburb that has the most hours of sunshine, with an average of 2,100 hours each year. Autumn is the driest season in Nepean with only  of rainfall annually. The gardening zone for this area is 6A.

Education 
Anglophone schools in Nepean are administered by the Ottawa-Carleton District School Board (OCDSB) and the Ottawa-Carleton Catholic School Board (OCCSB). Both the OCDSB and OCCSB headquarters are located within Nepean itself.

Francophone education is provided by the Conseil des écoles publiques de l'Est de l'Ontario (CÉPEO) and the Conseil des écoles catholiques du Centre-Est (CECCE).

Schools in Nepean include:

Public schools

Elementary 

Adrienne Clarkson Elementary School
Barrhaven Public School
Bayshore Public School
Bells Corners Public School
Berrigan Elementary School
Briargreen Public School
Chapman Mills Public School
Farley Mowat Public School
Jockvale Elementary School
Knoxdale Public School
Lakeview Public School
École élémentaire publique Michaelle-Jean
Manordale Public School
Mary Honeywell Elementary School
Meadowlands Public School 
Sir Winston Churchill Public School

Intermediate 
Cedarview Middle School

Secondary 

Bell High School
John McCrae Secondary School
Longfields-Davidson Heights Secondary School
Merivale High School
École secondaire publique Omer-Deslauriers
Sir Guy Carleton Secondary School
Sir Robert Borden High School

Special education 
Crystal Bay Centre for Special Education

Alternate Education 
Elizabeth Wyn Wood Secondary Alternate Program

Closed 
Graham Park Public School closed 1988
J.S. Woodsworth Secondary School closed 2005
Parkwood Hills Public School closed 2010 
Century Public School closed 2017
D. Aubrey Moodie Intermediate School closed 2017
Greenbank Public Middle School closed 2017
Leslie Park Public School closed 2017

Catholic schools

Elementary 

Monsignor Paul Baxter School
Our Lady of Peace School
Pope John XXIII School
St. Andrew School
St. Elizabeth Ann Seton School
St. Emily School
St. Gregory School
St. John the Apostle School
St. Luke School, Nepean
St. Monica School
St. Patrick School
St. Rita School
St. Rose of Lima School

Intermediate 
Frank Ryan Intermediate School

Secondary 

École Secondaire Catholique Pierre-Savard
Collège catholique Franco-Ouest
St. Mother Teresa High School
St. Joseph High School
St. Paul High School

Continuing Education 
St. Patrick's Adult School

Post-Secondary 
Algonquin College (main campus)

Economy 
Running north-south, Merivale Road is the retail centre of Nepean, offering many smaller shops as well as big box stores. Colonnade Road Business Park is to the west of Merivale Road and south of Borden Farm, supporting many businesses along its two branches, including some federal offices such as the Public Health Agency of Canada and Canadian Corps of Commissionaires, and an OC Transpo bus depot. The boulevard of Hunt Club West hosts a large auto mall, big box stores, PetSmart, and Costco's Canadian headquarters, as well as a retail location. Further south is the Bentley Avenue industrial park where many independent auto shops are located, and a precast concrete factory. Several petroleum companies have fuel storage facilities in the area.

Places of interest 
Ben Franklin Place, located in Centrepointe, was the city hall for Nepean until it became a part of Ottawa. Now, it serves as a government office and client service centre, as well as continuing to be home to a branch of the Ottawa Public Library and the Centrepointe Theatre.

Nepean Museum located at 16 Rowley Avenue, Nepean Ontario is a museum that collects, preserves, researches, exhibits and interprets the works of man and nature in Nepean.

Media 
Nepean This Week is a weekly publication distributed in the Nepean area.

The Ottawa area's CTV affiliate, CJOH-DT, was headquartered on Merivale Road in Nepean. The studio was home to shows such as Graham Kerr's The Galloping Gourmet, and the cult children's classic You Can't Do That on Television. The building was ravaged by a fire on February 7, 2010, and was demolished in 2011. The Merivale Road complex is still home to Corus Entertainment's English-language stations CKQB-FM and CJOT-FM.

Famous Nepeanites 
The following famous people were either born in, raised in, or consider Nepean their home town:

Jamie Baker, hockey player, sports broadcaster
Fred Brathwaite, hockey player and coach
Jeff Brown, hockey player and coach
Andrew Calof, hockey player
Jeff Chychrun, hockey player
Doug Frobel, baseball player
Chester Hansen, musician
Charmaine Hooper, soccer player
Jesse Levine, tennis player
Steve MacLean, astronaut
Sandra Oh, actress
Jesse Palmer, football player, television personality
Darren Pang, hockey player, hockey analyst
Shermar Paul, rapper, songwriter, record producer
Klea Scott, actress
MacKenzie Weegar, hockey player
Jason York, hockey player, broadcaster
Steve Yzerman, hockey player, current GM of the Detroit Red Wings
Jeff Zywicki, lacrosse player

References

Bibliography

Neighbourhoods in Ottawa
Former municipalities now in Ottawa
Former cities in Ontario
Populated places disestablished in 2000